The Bangsamoro Parliament is the legislature of Bangsamoro, an autonomous region of the Philippines. It is currently led by the Bangsamoro Transition Authority, an interim regional governing body. The inaugural session of the parliament took place on March 29, 2019, while its first regular session is projected to take place in 2025.

History
The first Bangsamoro Parliament is an interim legislature headed by the Bangsamoro Transition Authority (BTA). The first set of members of the BTA took their oath on February 22, 2019. The effective abolishment of the precursor autonomous region, Autonomous Region in Muslim Mindanao (ARMM) took place following the official turnover of the ARMM to the Bangsamoro Autonomous Region occurred on February 26, 2019.

The first interim Bangsamoro Parliament had its inaugural session on March 29, 2019, and passed four resolutions, two of which involved the budget for the Bangsamoro region. The interim Bangsamoro Parliament's mandate was supposed to end on June 30, 2022, as per the Bangsamoro Organic Law, but this was extended to 2025 by law passed by President Rodrigo Duterte whose presidency ended on the same day the interim parliament is supposed to be dissolved.

The second interim parliament had its inaugural session on September 12, 2022. Duterte's successor President Bongbong Marcos appointed a new set of members for the interim parliament. The MILF nominees include people associated with the MNLF — eight from the Sema-Jikiri faction and seven from the Nur Misuari's faction. Misuari's group became part of the parliament for the first time.

Composition
As per law, the legislature should be composed of at least 80 members, who in turn are led by the Speaker of the Parliament which was appointed from among the members of the legislature. Until June 30, 2019, 24 elective officials of the defunct Autonomous Region in Muslim Mindanao could have served as additional members.

Pangalian Balindong is the Speaker of the Parliament. Sha Elijah Dumama-Alba is the Floor Leader. In the first interim parliament there was a Majority Leader and a Minority Leader but these position were scrapped in the second interim parliament.

40 percent of the parliament seats are allotted to representatives of Bangsamoro's parliamentary districts. Although the districts are yet to be constituted. The Bangsamoro parliamentary districts will exist independently from the legislative districts used to determine representation in the national House of Representatives.

There are also legal provisions to deter members of the parliament to switch political party allegiance. Changing political party affiliation within the term of a parliament member's term means forfeiture of seat. Changing of affiliation within six months prior to a parliamentary elections renders the person ineligible as a nominee of a political party seeking representation in the parliament.

Seal

The current seal of the Bangsamoro Parliament is in use since 2021 and its specifications is defined under Bangsamoro Autonomy Act No. 16. It is a circular symbol with a green, red, white, and yellow color scheme patterned after the Bangsamoro Flag and bears the name of the Parliament. Its central element is a shield baring the Bangsamoro flag and is partially surrounded by a semicircle parliament diagram with 80 blocks signifying the number of seats in the parliament. The book on top of the shield which represents the "living adherence of the Parliament to the rule of law" while the text "2019", representing the foundation year of Bangsamoro. The Bangsamoro Autonomy Act No. 16, as Parliament Bill No. 24 was passed by the Bangsamoro Parliament on January 19, 2021. A previous version of the seal was used prior to the passage of the bill, with the book, foundation year absent in the prior version. The modified seal was formally adopted after the Chief Minister sign the bill into law on February 12, 2021.

2nd interim parliament

Parliamentary groups

Leadership

See also 
ARMM Regional Legislative Assembly
Bangsamoro Youth Model Parliament

References

External links

Policy Research and Legal Services Department

Parliament
Legislatures of country subdivisions
Legislatures of the Philippines
2019 establishments in the Philippines